Moka is a district of Mauritius, situated in the central plateau of the island. The district has an area of 230.5 km2 and the population estimate was at 83,664 as at the end of 2019.

History

Places of interest
 bagatelle mall,

Places
The Moka District includes different regions; however, some regions are further divided into different suburbs. Note that the statistics do not take into account that Ripailles was created out of Nouvelle Découverte and that Pailes was absorbed by Port-Louis Municipal Council in 2011 following the new Local Government Act.

Places by population

Education

French international schools:
 Lycée des Mascareignes - Senior high/Sixth form
 École du Centre/Collège Pierre-Poivre - Primary and junior high school

See also

 Districts of Mauritius
 List of places in Mauritius

References 

 
Districts of Mauritius